Luhansk power station (formerly Luhanskaya GRES) is a thermal power station north of Shchastia, near Luhansk, Ukraine. It was built between 1950 and 1956 and its first generator was connected to the grid on 30 September 1956. In 1957, 4 turbines and 7 boilers went in service. In 1958, it was completed.

Between 1979 and 2004, Luhansk power station was modernized. It consists today of 4 units with 200 MW, 3 units of 175 MW and 1 unit of 100 MW.

War in Donbas
On 3 September 2014, Ukrainian Aidar Battalion commander Serhiy Melnychuk announced that they had mined the plant (which gives electricity to 98% of Luhansk Oblast), and that they will blow it up if the separatist forces advanced. On 17 September, part of the plant exploded due to combat in the zone, while firefighters couldn't act due to the fire and the mines planted.

The plant suspended work on 21 February 2022, head of the Luhansk Regional Administration Serhiy Haidai stated this was due to shelling by the Russian separatist forces in Donbas. The next day the plant was shelled again.

See also

 List of power stations in Ukraine

References

Coal-fired power stations in Ukraine
Shchastia Raion